Baladeh Kojur Rural District is a rural district (dehestan) in the Central District of Nowshahr County, Mazandaran Province, Iran. At the 2006 census, its population was 17,085, in 4,335 families. The rural district has 19 villages.

References 

Rural Districts of Mazandaran Province
Nowshahr County